Cyanide is an Indian 2006 Kannada-language drama film written and directed by A. M. R. Ramesh.  The plot of the film set in and around Bangalore from 1 to 20 August 1991, deals with incidents surrounding the assassins of former Indian Prime Minister Rajiv Gandhi. It stars Ravi Kale as Sivarasan (One-eyed Jack), the mastermind of the assassination. Malavika Avinash, Tara, Rangayana Raghu in pivotal roles. The supporting cast features Avinash, Nassar and Suresh Heblikar. The film was partially re-shot/dubbed in Tamil as Kuppi.

Upon theatrical release on 7 July 2006, the film received widespread critical acclaim. Critics acclaimed the film's narration, the acting performances of Ravi Kale, Rangayana Raghu, Tara and Malavika Avinash, and the camerawork and editing of the film. At the 2006–07 Karnataka State Film Awards the film won two awards – Third Best Film and Best Actress (Tara). For his portrayal of Ranganath, who sheltered the assassins, Raghu was awarded the Best Supporting Actor at the 54th Filmfare Awards South. The film is seen by some critics as one of the finest films ever made in Kannada cinema.

Cast

Critical reception
Reviewing the film, R. G. Vijayasarathy of Rediff.com said it "shocks and surprises", and wrote, "[Its] dialogues are crisp, narration has good pace, camera angles and lighting match the mood and the background score fits perfectly." He added, "It is an outstanding effort that needs appreciation and applause." The reviewer of Viggy.com felt the film's USPs were "its gripped narration, simplistic presentation" and "the style of picturising a dynamic story in an entertaining way". He concluded praising the performance of all the lead characters in the film. Sify.com commended the performance of the cast and added, "The camera work of Ratnavelu on the proceedings of 20 days of life of Shivarasan & gang is very effectively shown on screen, while Sandeep Chowta?s background score is awesome." The reviewer of Nowrunning.com called it a "perfect ten film" and wrote, ""Cyanide" is fantastically packaged with the finest technical values and some great acting performances." Indiaglitz.com wrote, "Thara the national award winning actress as timid and chicken hearted Mridula has given a splendid performance. Avinash as DCP Kempaiah, Rangayana Raghu as Ranganath and Ravi Kaale as Shivarasan are apt."

Accolades
2006–07 Karnataka State Film Awards
 Third Best Film
 Best Actress – Tara

54th Filmfare Awards South
 Best Supporting Actor – Kannada – Rangayana Raghu

References

External links
 

2000s Kannada-language films
2006 films
Works about the assassination of Rajiv Gandhi
Films scored by Sandeep Chowta
Indian multilingual films
Films directed by A. M. R. Ramesh
Indian Peace Keeping Force